Estadio Palogrande is a multi-purpose stadium in Manizales, Colombia. It is currently used mostly for football (soccer) matches. With renovations made for the 2011 FIFA U-20 World Cup in Colombia, the stadium capacity dropped to 32,000 people. The first Palogrande was built in 1936 and  demolished in 1993, and the current Palogrande was inaugured in 1994. Once Caldas plays its home matches at this stadium and won the Copa Libertadores in 2004.

External links
 Colombia 2011 FIFA U-20 World Cup 2011 FIFA U-20 World Cup
 Stadium picture  
 Estadio Palogrande 1. (Inside)
 Estadio Palogrande 2. (Outside)

References

Estadio Palogrande
Sports venues completed in 1936
Football venues in Colombia
Copa América stadiums
Multi-purpose stadiums in Colombia
Estadio Palogrande
Buildings and structures in Manizales
1936 establishments in Colombia